Ralph Joseph Chesnauskas (born c. 1935) was an American football player.

Early years
Chesnauskas grew up in Brockton, Massachusetts. He was an honor student at Brockton High School and on the school's football team as an end and on the baseball team as an outfielder.

Military Academy
He entered the United States Military Academy in 1952. At the Academy, he was moved from end to guard. As a sophomore, he also converted 21 of 25 extra point kicks. He was also described by Army coach Earl Blaik as a "furious but heady defensive player." He was selected by the Associated Press as a first-team player on its 1954 All-America college football team. He also played baseball at Army and hit the longest home run ever at West Point.

Later years
Chesnauskas was inducted into the Army Sports Hall of Fame in 2009.

References

American football guards
Army Black Knights football players
Sportspeople from Brockton, Massachusetts
Players of American football from Massachusetts
Military personnel from Massachusetts